Michelle Stitzlein is an American artist who creates found object art / sculpture from recycled materials. She received a BFA in 1989 from the Columbus College of Art and Design (in Columbus, Ohio). She and her husband Nathaniel Stitzlein (also an artist) founded Art Grange Studios in Baltimore, Ohio. At Art Grange they share their love of art with the public by offering tours of the studios as well as art workshops for all ages.

Elevating the Unimpressive

Stitzlein's assemblages of mostly discarded materials propels the viewer to reassess that which is often overlooked.   "As an artist and as a person, I ask myself to look closer, lest I miss the one exquisite trait in something oftentimes regarded as distasteful, old, tired, unimpressive or just plain ugly so that I may see it again with fresh eyes."

Kurt Shaw writes, "If, as the Jungian psychoanalyst and poet Clarissa Pinkola Estes would have us believe, butterflies are "Soul Birds," then Stitzlein sets the mind free to wonder not what junk is, but what it can be. "

Moth series 

Combining an artistic boldness with the premise that recycled materials have the capacity to metamorphose into larger objects of great beauty, Stitzlein's series of more than 14 wall hung sculptures moths range in size from 3 to 11 feet.

She began working on this series in 2003, inspired by "myriad varieties of beautiful, exotic moths in my own backyard."

These pieces are cobbled together in the most pristine way from old piano keys, tin cans, license plates and bicycle tires, among other things.

Bottle cap art

Michelle Stitzlein offers workshops, demonstrations and lectures about creating sculpture from plastic bottle caps and other recycled materials. Each event is catered specifically to the needs of the venue and occasion.

She has also written a book outlining projects for children, families, schools and non-profits utilizing recycled, plastic bottle caps.

References

External links
 Art Grange | Michelle Salrin Stitzlein's biography
 Art & Design by Michelle and Nathaniel Stitzlein | Art Grange

1967 births
Living people
Sculptors from Ohio
Postmodern artists
Columbus College of Art and Design alumni
People from Baltimore, Ohio